David Coker may refer to:

David Robert Coker, agricultural reformer
Mrs. David R. Coker, founder of Kalmia Gardens
Dave Coker, musician in Wubble-U

See also
David Coke, British aviator